Agonopterix banatica is a moth of the family Depressariidae. It is found in Romania.

References

Moths described in 1965
Agonopterix
Endemic fauna of Romania
Moths of Europe